Louis Joseph "Lou" Schiappacasse (March 29, 1881 – September 20, 1910), nicknamed "Shippy," was a professional baseball player from 1902 to 1910.  He briefly played Major League Baseball for the Detroit Tigers in September 1902.  He died in 1910 at the age of 29 from typhoid fever.

Early years
According to his State of Michigan death certificate, Louis Joseph "Lou" Schiappacasse was born March 29, 1881, in Ann Arbor, Michigan, the son of Anton "Anthony" J Schiappacasse and Caterina "Catherine" Schiappacasse both originally of Neirone, Genoa, Liguria, Italy.  Lou's father, Anton, was a fruit dealer and confectioner operating from locations on Main Street in Ann Arbor, Michigan until his death on August 28, 1899 in Ann Arbor, Michigan.  Lou's mother, Caterina, died on September 17, 1895, in Ann Arbor, Michigan.  Both are buried in the Anton Schiappacasse family plot along with their children in the Saint Thomas Catholic Cemetery in Ann Arbor, Michigan.

Baseball career

Detroit Tigers
Schiappacasse played two games in Major League Baseball. Both games were for the Detroit Tigers on September 7th and 8th of 1902. In his two Major League Baseball games, he was hitless with a base on balls in six plate appearances for a .167 on-base percentage.  He played right field for the Detroit Tigers; making an error on his only chance.  Schiappacasse is one of the rare players with career batting averages and fielding percentages of .000.  He also holds the distinction of having the longest last name (13 letters) of any player for the Detroit Tigers in their 100+ year history.  (Boots Poffenberger, Steve Partenheimer, and Vito Valentinetti) are tied for 2nd with 12 letters.)

Minor leagues
During the 1903 season, Schiappacasse played third base for the Holland, Michigan independent team.

In January 1904, he was signed by the Detroit Tigers for a spring training try-out.  However, he did not play for the Detroit Tigers in 1904 and instead played for the Monroe Hill Citys in the Cotton States League.  He continued thereafter to play minor league baseball for the Augusta Tourists of the South Atlantic League (1905, 1906), Birmingham Barons of the Southern Association (1905), Charleston Sea Gulls of the South Atlantic League (1907), Tecumseh in the Southern Michigan League (1908),  Saginaw Wa-wahs in the Southern Michigan League (1909), and Muskegon Speed Boys of the West Michigan League (1910).

Death
At the time of the 1910 U.S. Federal Census, Louis Joseph "Lou" Schiappacasse was living at 630 Main Street in Ann Arbor, Michigan with his older sister, Teresa M Schiappacasse and younger brother, Alexander Joseph Schiappacasse.

Louis Joseph "Lou" Schiappacasse died at home on September 20, 1910, after a week-long bout of typhoid fever at the age of 29 years, 5 months and 21 days.  He was buried September 22, 1922, in the Anton Schiappacasse family plot at Saint Thomas Catholic Cemetery in Ann Arbor, Michigan alongside his parents and siblings.

References

1881 births
1910 deaths
Detroit Tigers players
Major League Baseball right fielders
Baseball players from Ann Arbor, Michigan
Deaths from typhoid fever
Monroe Hill Citys players
Augusta Tourists players
Birmingham Barons players
Charleston Sea Gulls players
Tecumseh (minor league baseball) players
Saginaw Wa-was players
Muskegon Speed Boys players